The Moonlight Butterfly is a 2011 studio album by The Sea and Cake, released on Thrill Jockey.

Track listing

Personnel
 Sam Prekop – vocals, guitar
 Archer Prewitt – guitar, keyboards, ukulele
 Eric Claridge – bass guitar
 John McEntire – drums, synthesizer

Charts

References

External links 
 
 The Moonlight Butterfly at Thrill Jockey

2011 albums
The Sea and Cake albums
Thrill Jockey albums